The list of recipients of the Order of Industrial Heroism (OIH) contains 440 recipients, who received awards between its inception in 1923 and dissolution in 1964.

Sometimes there were multiple awards relating to one event; six of the awards were to miners' union lodges, rather than individuals, where a large number of members had been involved in mine rescues. Only one of the solo awardees was a woman; another received one alongside three men.

References 

 

Lists of award winners
Lists of 20th-century people